Calephorus is the type genus of the Calephorini; a tribe of grasshoppers found in Africa, Europe and Indo-China.

Species
 Calephorus compressicornis (Latreille, 1804) - Europe, N Africa - type species (as "Acrydium compressicornis" Latreille)
 Calephorus ornatus (Walker, F., 1870) - Madagascar
 Calephorus vitalisi Bolivar, I., 1914 - Indo-China

References

External links

Acridinae
Acrididae genera
Orthoptera of Africa
Orthoptera of Asia
Orthoptera of Europe
Orthoptera of Indo-China